Obednik is a village in the municipality of Demir Hisar, North Macedonia. This village is only 5 to 7 km (3 to 4 mi) away from the historic village of Smilevo.  Obednik has many tobacco fields, and is surrounded by mountains.

Demographics
In statistics gathered by Vasil Kanchov in 1900, the village of Obednik was inhabited by 250 Muslim Albanians.

According to the 2002 census, the village had a total of 273 inhabitants. Ethnic groups in the village include:

Albanians 139 
Macedonians 134

References

External links

Villages in Demir Hisar Municipality
Albanian communities in North Macedonia